The term "world riddle" or "world-riddle" has been associated, for over 100 years, with Friedrich Nietzsche (who mentioned Welträthsel in several of his writings)
and with the biologist-philosopher Ernst Haeckel, who, as a professor of zoology at the University of Jena, wrote the book Die Welträthsel in 1895–1899, in modern spelling Die Welträtsel (German; "The World-riddles"), with the English version published under the title The Riddle of the Universe, 1901.

The term "world riddle" concerns the nature of the universe and the meaning of life.

The question and answer of the World Riddle has also been examined as an inspiration or allegorical meaning within some musical compositions, such as the unresolved harmonic progression at the end of Also sprach Zarathustra (1896) by composer Richard Strauss.

View of Nietzsche 

Friedrich Nietzsche referred to the "World Riddle" (Welträthsel) in several of his writings; however, his direct influence was limited to a few years, by his failing health.

Emil du Bois-Reymond 
Emil du Bois-Reymond used the term "World Riddle" in 1880 for seven great questions of science, such as the ultimate nature of matter and the origin of simple sensations. In a lecture to the Berlin Academy of Sciences he declared that neither science nor philosophy could ever explain these riddles.

View of Haeckel 
Ernst Haeckel viewed the World Riddle as a dual-question of the form, "What is the nature of the physical universe and what is the nature of human thinking?" which he explained, in a lecture in 1892, would have a single answer since humans and the universe were contained within one system, a mono-system:

Haeckel had written that human behavior and feeling could be explained, within the laws of the physical universe, as "mechanical work of the ganglion-cells" as stated.

View of William James 
The philosopher and psychologist William James has questioned the attitude of thinking that a single answer applies to everything or everyone. In his book Pragmatism (1907) he satirized the world-riddle as follows:

See also 

Epistemology - study of the nature of knowledge.
Existentialism - philosophy of being/existence.
Weltschmerz

Notes

References 
 Ernst Haeckel, The Riddle of the Universe (Die Welträthsel or Die Weltraetsel, 1895–1899), Publisher: Prometheus Books, Buffalo, New York, 1992, reprint edition, paperback, 405 pages, illustrated, .
 Ernst Haeckel, Monism as Connecting Religion and Science ("translated from German by J. Gilchrist, M.A., B.Sc., PH.D."), Project Gutenberg Literary Archive Foundation, Gutenberg.org webpage: GutenbergOrg-7mono10 (for free download).

Concepts in epistemology
Concepts in metaphysics
Existentialist concepts
Philosophy of Friedrich Nietzsche
Intellectual history
History of philosophy
Metaphysics of mind
Philosophical problems
Philosophical theories
Philosophy of life
Philosophy of mind